is a Japanese anime OVA directed by Naoyoshi Shiotani, animated by Production I.G. and, based on Fumiko Tanikawa's manga of the same title.

In October 2007, it was screened at the Tokyo International Film Festival and was then released to DVD on December 5, 2007, in Japan.

The animation is a collaboration between Production I.G and BMG Japan in commemoration of both companies' 20th anniversaries. The story follows a young man and woman, both unlucky in love, as they begin to fall in love on Christmas Day - thanks to the intrusive actions of a Mini Donkey and the romantic backdrop of Tokyo Tower.

Plot
Chizuru loves Yuudai; Yuudai loves Chizuru. Yet, neither of them can say it clearly because, not only are they both uncertain about the other's feelings but, a mutual fear of hurt stemming from failed relationships in their pasts continues a pattern of misunderstandings. So trapped by their insecurities that their relationship is going nowhere, they drift further and further apart. While Chizuru thinks this is the end of the road, Yuudai struggles desperately to overcome his cowardly nature before he loses what is most important to him. There are two sides to every story, every relationship; but can love survive if both sides can't meet halfway?!

Staff
Naoyoshi Shiotani - Director and Mini Donkey character design
Fumiko Tanikawa - Character designer
Kyoji Asano - Animation director
Masaya Ozaki - Screenwriter
Production I.G - Original story
Takeshi Yanagawa - Music
Francesco Prandoni & Andrez Bergen - English edit

Awards
Tokyo Marble Chocolate was awarded the Grand Prize in the Feature Film Category of the 12th Seoul International Cartoon & Animation Festival (SICAF 2008), held in Seoul, Republic of Korea, from May 21 to 25, 2008.

The jury was composed of Giannalberto Bendazzi (a professor of the history of animation at Milano State University in Italy), Noriko T. Wada (a Japanese producer) and Kyung-jo Min (a South Korean director). The award ceremony took place in Seoul on May 25, 2008.

References

External links
Tokyo Marble Chocolate at Production I.G.

http://www.sicaf.or.kr/2008/index.jsp SICAF 2008 website

2007 anime OVAs
Anime with original screenplays
Production I.G
Romance anime and manga